Brooke Castile (born May 31, 1986) is an American former competitive pair skater. With Benjamin Okolski, she is the 2008 Four Continents bronze medalist, 2007 Nebelhorn Trophy champion, and 2007 U.S. national champion.

Personal life 
Castile was born on May 31, 1986 in Detroit, Michigan. On June 25, 2013, she married engineer and former ice dancer Kevin O'Keefe, whom she had dated for ten years.

Career 
Castile began skating at age seven. She teamed up with Benjamin Okolski after the 2002 U.S. Championships. They won two bronze medals on the ISU Junior Grand Prix series. They placed 7th at their first Four Continents in 2005. Following the 2006 U.S. Championships, Castile and Okolski changed coaches to Johnny Johns and Marina Zueva at the Arctic Figure Skating Club in Canton, Michigan. They won the 2007 U.S. Championships, earning them the right to compete at 2007 Four Continents, where they were 5th, and then to make their World debut, where they finished 12th.

In the 2007–08 season, Castile and Okolski were assigned to 2007 Nebelhorn Trophy, 2007 Skate America, and 2007 Trophée Eric Bompard, but withdrew from all three due to injury. They won bronze at the 2008 U.S. Championships and went on to win a bronze medal in their third Four Continents appearance. They finished 11th at their second World Championships.

In 2008–09, they also withdrew from their Grand Prix assignments, 2008 Cup of China and 2008 Cup of Russia, due to injury. They finished 5th at the 2009 U.S. Championships.

In the 2009–10 season, Castile and Okolski were 6th at 2009 Skate America. Their 4th-place finish at the 2010 U.S. Championships meant they did not make the U.S. team to the 2010 Winter Olympics. They announced their retirement from competitive skating in May 2010.

In November 2010, Castile was cast on ABC's Skating with the Stars, partnered with Jonny Moseley. Moseley sliced her finger in a practice accident.

Castile is a coach and choreographer at the St. Clair Shores Figure Skating Club.

Programs

Competitive highlights
GP: Grand Prix; JGP: Junior Grand Prix

with Okolski

References

External links

Official site

Living people
American female pair skaters
1986 births
Figure skaters from Detroit
Four Continents Figure Skating Championships medalists
21st-century American women
20th-century American women